Eupithecia fumimixta is a moth in the  family Geometridae. It is found in Costa Rica.

References

Moths described in 1900
fumimixta
Moths of Central America